Corymbia chippendalei, commonly known as the sand-dune bloodwood or sandhill bloodwood, is a species of small tree or a mallee that is endemic to desert country in central Australia. It has rough bark on part or all of the trunk, lance-shaped adult leaves, flower buds in groups of seven, white flowers and shortened spherical fruit.

Descrtiption
It has rough, flaky or tessellated bark on part or all of the trunk, smooth cream-coloured or white bark above. Flowering occurs from January to March and the flowers are white.

Taxonomy and naming
The sand-dune bloodwood was first formally described in 1985 by Denis Carr and Stella Carr and was given the name Eucalyptus chippendalei. In 1995 Ken Hill and Lawrie Johnson changed the name to Corymbia chippendalei. The specific epithet (chippendalei) honours George Chippendale.

Distribution and habitat
Corymbia chippendalei usually grows on the crest of sand dunes in the Great Sandy Desert and central ranges of far eastern Western Australia, and in the south-west of the Northern Territory.

See also
 List of Corymbia species

References

chippendalei
Myrtales of Australia
Flora of Western Australia
Flora of the Northern Territory
Plants described in 1985
Taxa named by Maisie Carr